Power is the second studio album of English musician Fryars.

References 

2014 albums
Pop albums by English artists